Peter D. Jarvis is an Australian physicist notable for his work on applications of group theory to physical problems, particularly supersymmetry in the genetic code. He has also applied classical invariant theory to problems of quantum physics (entanglement measures for mixed state systems), and also to phylogenetic reconstruction (entanglement measures, including distance measures, for taxonomic pattern frequencies).

Education
Jarvis obtained his BSc and MSc from the University of Adelaide. He also has a PhD from Imperial College, London, where he studied under Robert Delbourgo, for a thesis entitled Noise Voltages Produced by Flux Motion in Superconductors.

Career
Jarvis works at the School of Mathematics and Physics, at the University of Tasmania. His main focus is on algebraic structures in mathematical physics and their applications, especially combinatorial Hopf algebras in integrable systems and quantum field theory.

See also
 Quantum Aspects of Life

Notes

External links
Jarvis' math genealogy
homepage

Living people
People from Tasmania
Alumni of Imperial College London
Australian physicists
Academic staff of the University of Tasmania
Quantum physicists
Year of birth missing (living people)